List of Guggenheim Fellowships awarded in 2021:

References 

2021
2021 awards